Poecilocera is a genus of aquatic leaf beetles in the family Chrysomelidae. The only described species in Poecilocera is P. harrisii.

References

Further reading

 
 

Donaciinae
Articles created by Qbugbot